The following lists events that happened in 2005 in Libya.

Incumbents
President: Muammar al-Gaddafi
Prime Minister: Shukri Ghanem

Events

January
 January 20 - Italian police have arrested number of people connected to smuggling of illegal immigrants from Libya.

March
 March 23 - Muammar al-Gaddafi states that he is not going to pardon five Bulgarian nurses that face a death penalty accused of injecting children with the HIV.

May
 May 17 - Six African countries begin a two-day summit in Tripoli to assess situation in Darfur, Sudan. None of the local rebel groups have sent representatives.

December
 December 25 - The Supreme Court in Libya overturned the death sentences given to international health workers charged with infecting children with HIV.

References

 
Years of the 21st century in Libya
Libya
Libya
2000s in Libya